Daniel A. Biederman is an American urban redevelopment expert and public space management consultant. He is the co-founder of Grand Central Partnership, 34th Street Partnership, and Bryant Park Corporation, three Business Improvement Districts (BIDs) and private park managers operating in Midtown Manhattan, and is also the President of Biederman Redevelopment Ventures, a place-making consulting firm. Biederman has been cited for his success in using private funding to revitalize urban public spaces.

Bryant Park Corporation
In 1980 Biederman and Andrew Heiskell, then-Chairman of Time, Inc. and the New York Public Library, co-founded the Bryant Park Corporation (BPC).  The not-for-profit private management company was created by the Rockefeller Brothers Fund to bring improvements to Bryant Park, a  park in Midtown Manhattan that had suffered a severe, decades-long decline. BPC immediately brought enhanced security and sanitation to the park and began slowly to rehabilitate its physical plant.

In 1987, the City of New York signed a 15-year agreement entrusting BPC with sole responsibility for managing, programming, and improving the park, whereupon it was closed for a four-year renovation. The project entailed improving existing, and creating additional, park entrances to increase visibility from the street, enhancing the formal French garden design, and improving the park's paths and lighting. BPC's plan also included restoring the park's monuments, renovating its long-closed restrooms, and building two restaurant pavilions and four permanent food kiosks.

After a four-year effort overseen by Biederman, the park reopened in 1992 to widespread acclaim. Called "a triumph for many" by The New York Times architectural critic Paul Goldberger, the renovation was lauded for its architectural excellence. The renovation was also lauded as "The Best Example of Urban Renewal" by New York magazine, and was described by Time as a "small miracle". Many awards followed, including a Design Merit Award from Landscape Architecture Magazine, and a 1996 Award for Excellence from the Urban Land Institute.

34th Street Partnership
34th Street Partnership (34SP) was founded in 1989 when then-Mayor David Dinkins and property owners on 34th Street asked Biederman to spearhead efforts to improve the area adjacent to Madison Square Garden in preparation for the 1992 Democratic National Convention.

In January 1992, the Partnership opened a $6 million annual program of security, sanitation, tourist information, public events, and debt service on a major capital improvement bond of $25 million for improvements to the district's street, sidewalks, and plazas.

In 1999, 34SP completed a project to redevelop the formerly dangerous Herald Square Park and Greeley Square Park, two triangular public spaces located at the convergence of Broadway, Sixth Avenue, and 34th Street. The renovation included adding a public restroom and permanent food kiosk to each park, as well as installing horticultural elements, chairs, and tables.

The 34SP BID continues to operate across the 31 blocks comprising the 34th Street District. The capital improvements have been widely regarded as a prime reason for the rise in 34th Street property values that began in the 1990s and continues to this day, with "rapid appreciation on nearly every street". 34th Street Partnership has also been credited with attracting national retailers to 34th Street, and for the rise in retail rents.

As President of 34SP, Biederman has criticized the condition of New York's streetscape and has led efforts to upgrade it.

34SP has worked with shop owners on 34th Street to improve the appearance of store frontage and to curtail the use of opaque steel doors during closing hours.

The BID's design and capital departments have greatly reduced the number of individual newsboxes in the district, and convinced publishers to place their publications in 34SP's own multiple newsboxes.

Senior 34SP staff has lobbied NYC government to enforce laws prohibiting bus and truck idling, and to move intercity buses away from the 34th Street District.

Grand Central Partnership
In 1984 then-Mayor Ed Koch, at the behest of executives from many of the Fortune 500 companies that are headquartered near Grand Central Terminal in New York, asked Biederman to help make the downtrodden area around the terminal commensurate with the offices nearby. Biederman formed the Grand Central Partnership (GCP), a Business Improvement District that provided enhanced security, sanitation, and streetscape improvements to the area.

GCP was one of several Midtown Manhattan BIDs to be given credit for the economic and environmental revival of the area in the 1990s.

After a series of disagreements with then-Mayor Rudy Giuliani over rules governing BIDs, Biederman resigned from GCP in 1998. He continues to serve as President of Bryant Park Corporation and 34th Street Partnership.

Private Consulting - Biederman Redevelopment Ventures
Biederman Redevelopment Ventures (BRV) specializes in creating and operating transformative redevelopment projects in the public realm. BRV works for real estate developers, government agencies, and non-profit organizations (and often a combination of the three), as well as professional sports teams, to conceive and execute concepts that provide communities with new and innovative amenities.

BRV has led many of the most value-creating urban redevelopment projects in the United States, beginning in 1980 at Bryant Park, which at the time was a troubled public space that hurt the values of the real estate that surrounded it. Now it is the most densely-used park in the world, an international model for revitalizing public spaces.

BRV was founded in 1998 and has taken the tools and principles developed at Bryant Park and applied them in 32 states and eight foreign countries. Over the years, BRV has consulted on a wide variety of projects, ranging from small parks to large urban districts. Among the notable projects are the development and operation of Klyde Warren Park in Dallas, TX; the redevelopment of the Canalside waterfront district in Buffalo, NY; the development of Levy Park in Houston, TX; the revitalization of Military Park in Newark, NJ; and the creation of Titletown District in Green Bay, WI. No matter the city, BRV has built a consensus among property owners and government around the demonstrated return on investment in placemaking.

References

Year of birth missing (living people)
Living people
American real estate businesspeople
People from Chappaqua, New York
Princeton School of Public and International Affairs alumni
Harvard Business School alumni
Scarsdale High School alumni